Samuel O'Neill (1 August 1912 – 18 July 1983) was a New Zealand cricketer. He played in eleven first-class matches for Wellington from 1944 to 1952.

See also
 List of Wellington representative cricketers

References

External links
 

1912 births
1983 deaths
New Zealand cricketers
Wellington cricketers
People from Waihi
Cricketers from Waikato